The Texan schooner Louisville was ninety-five-ton schooner that served as a tender in the Texas Navy. The Louisville, which is sometimes referred to as the Striped Pig, was purchased for $4,000 on September 25, 1839 by the Republic of Texas navy agent William Thomas Brannum. When acquired, the Louisville came complete with sails, rigging, and seven water casks.

References

Naval ships of the Republic of Texas
Ships of the Texas Navy
1839 ships
Sloops